Basadi-ye Sofla (also Romanized as Bāşadī-ye Soflá; also known as Bāşadī-ye Pā’īn, Basedi, Bāşedī-ye Shahreyārī, and Bāşedī-ye Shahrīārī) is a village in Howmeh-ye Sharqi Rural District, in the Central District of Ramhormoz County, Khuzestan Province, Iran. At the 2006 census, its population was 139, in 30 families.

References 

Populated places in Ramhormoz County